Tabernaemontana macrocarpa grows as a shrub or tree up to  tall, with a trunk diameter of up to . The bark is yellowish brown, brown, grey-brown or grey. Its fragrant flowers feature combinations of cream, white and orange corolla lobes. The specific epithet  is from the Greek meaning "with large fruit". Its habitat is forests from sea level to  altitude. Tabernaemontana macrocarpa has been used as arrow poison. The species is native to Thailand and Malesia.

References

macrocarpa
Plants described in 1822
Flora of Thailand
Flora of Malesia